The Perfect Picture: 10 Years Later is a 2019 Ghanaian film produced and directed by Shirley Frimpong-Manso and Ken Attoh. It is a sequel to Perfect Picture, also produced and written by Shirley Frimpong-Manso. At the 2020 Africa Magic Viewers' Choice Awards, Gloria Sarfo won the Best Supporting Actress in a Movie or TV Series for her role in the film.

Synopsis 
The original film was about three women pushing their thirties and making bold attempts to change their lives, but destiny had other plans for them. Now in the sequel, the ladies are back, this time pushing their forties. Even though they are older and wiser, they realise that now they are saddled with more issues including their not so fairy-tale relationships.

Cast 
 Lydia Forson as Dede
 Jackie Appiah as Aseye
 Naa Ashorkor Mensah-Doku as Akasi
 Chris Attoh as Larry
 Joselyn Dumas as Flora
 Adjetey Anang as Fella
 John Dumelo as Taylor
 Kwaku Sintim-Misa as Doctor Biney
 Richard Mofe-Damijo as Sam
 Beverly Naya as Samantha
 Anita Erskine as Angela
 Gideon Okeke as Yobanna
 Gloria Sarfo as Susanna
 Raphael Boakye as Nigel

References

External links
 

2019 films
Ghanaian comedy-drama films
2010s English-language films
English-language Ghanaian films